Austin Palmer Aune (born September 6, 1993) is an American football quarterback for the North Texas Mean Green and former professional baseball player. He was drafted by the New York Yankees in the second round of the 2012 MLB draft, where he played six seasons in the minor leagues before being released. He then enrolled at North Texas, and is the oldest starting quarterback in FBS football at the age of 29.

High school career 
Aune attended Argyle High School in Argyle, Texas. A two-sport star, he was the starting quarterback and also played shortstop on the baseball team. As a senior, he threw for 33 touchdowns and 3,411 yards while rushing for 9 touchdowns and 538 yards. A three-star quarterback prospect, he originally committed to TCU to play college football. But after being selected by the New York Yankees in the second round of the 2012 MLB Draft, Aune was offered a $1 million signing bonus to sign for the Yankees and so he chose to play professional baseball over collegiate football.

Professional baseball career 
Aune played six seasons of minor league baseball in the Yankees farm system. During his tenure in the minor leagues, he recorded 20 home runs and 148 RBIs. After bouncing between several High-A and Class-A teams and switching from shortstop to outfielder, Aune had a career batting average of .226 and was released by the Tampa Yankees following the 2017 season.

College career

North Texas
In 2018, months after being released by the Yankees, a 24-year-old Aune joined the Arkansas Razorbacks for their 2018 spring practice. He enrolled as a student, but the crowded quarterback room convinced him to transfer to North Texas instead.

2018-2020
Arriving at North Texas in 2018, he redshirted his freshman year. In 2019, he served as the third-string quarterback behind Mason Fine and Jason Bean, completing 4 of 5 passes for 136 yards in two appearances at quarterback. During the 2020 season, he backed up Bean while making eight appearances and three starts.

2021
After starting the season as a backup to junior transfer Jace Ruder, Aune won the starting position after week 5 and lead the Mean Green from a 1–3 start to a 6–6 finish in order to become bowl eligible, including an upset win over #22 UTSA, before losing to the Miami RedHawks in the 2021 Frisco Football Classic.

2022
Going into the 2022 season, Aune maintained his starting position against a crowded quarterback roster including Memphis transfer Grant Gunnell, leading the Mean Green to a 7–5 record and earning Conference USA Offensive Player of the Week honors in week zero. During the 2022 Conference USA Championship Game, Aune set a school record for touchdown passes in a single season with 32, surpassing former teammate Mason Fine. Aune played his final career game in the 2022 Frisco Bowl, throwing for 238 yards and a touchdown in a 32–35 defeat. After the game, Aune declared for the 2023 NFL Draft. Shortly after the end of the season, Aune changed his mind and entered his name in the NCAA transfer portal. On January 2, 2023, Aune withdrew from the transfer portal and redeclared for the upcoming NFL Draft. Aune finished his collegiate career with a 13–13 record as a starter, with 488 completions for 7,324 yards, 56 touchdowns, and 28 interceptions.

Statistics

Personal life 
Aune is the son of Greg and Karen Aune. Austin Aune married Kristin Massey in May 2021, and they have a daughter.

References

External links 
North Texas Mean Green bio

1993 births
Living people
American football quarterbacks
Baseball players from Texas
Charleston RiverDogs players
Gulf Coast Yankees players
North Texas Mean Green football players
Players of American football from Texas
Sportspeople from the Dallas–Fort Worth metroplex
Staten Island Yankees players
Tampa Yankees players